A bombing occurred on 23 December 2015 at a clothes bazaar in Pakistan's Parachinar area in the Kurram Valley. It was not clear whether the bombing was a suicide attack or a remotely controlled detonation. The blast killed 25 people and another 62 were injured.

See also
 2008 Parachinar bombing
 2013 Parachinar attack
 Terrorist incidents in Pakistan in 2015
 List of terrorist incidents, 2015

References

2015 murders in Pakistan
21st-century mass murder in Pakistan
Improvised explosive device bombings in Pakistan
Mass murder in 2015
Massacres in Pakistan
Terrorist incidents in Pakistan in 2015
2015
Attacks on buildings and structures in Pakistan
Marketplace attacks in Asia
Building bombings in Pakistan